In The Dark – Live at Vicar Street is a live album/Concert film by American singer-songwriter Josh Ritter. It was released on April 16, 2007. The album is a two disc CD/DVD set. It was recorded on back-to-back nights at the Vicar Street Theatre in Dublin, Ireland.

Track listing
All songs written by Josh Ritter.

Disc one (CD)
"Idaho" – 5:03
"Good Man" – 4:18
"Me & Jiggs" – 3:48
"Harrisburg" – 5:09
"Wings" – 6:07
"One More Mouth" – 3:54
"Lillian, Egypt" – 4:31
"Kathleen Intro" – 1:57
"Kathleen" – 4:59
"Best for the Best" – 4:51
"Girl in the War" – 4:32
"Thin Blue Flame" – 10:13
"Snow Is Gone" – 4:56
"Leaving" – 6:30

Disc two (DVD)
"Intro"
"Kathleen"
"Wolves"
"(Interview)"
"Girl in the War"
"Best for the Best"
"Monster Ballads"
"Gear Setup"
"Here at the Right Time"
"(Interview)"
"Harrisburg"
"(Interview)"
"One More Mouth"
"(Interview)"
"Idaho"
"In the Dark"
"(Interview)"
"Harbor Lights"
"Lillian, Egypt"
"Thin Blue Flames"
"Snow Is Gone"
"Parting Glass"
"(Interview)"
"Bone of Song"

Credits

Personnel
 Josh Ritter — vocals and guitars
 Zack Hickman – double bass, electric bass, acoustic guitar, electric guitar, background vocals
 Sam Kassirer — electric piano, piano, organs, guitar, percussion

Production
 Mixed by Dennis E. Powell
 Mastering by Chris Parmenidis
 Editing by Corrine Theodoru
 Directed by Dennis W. Fitzgerald

References

External links
Josh Ritter official website

2007 live albums
Josh Ritter albums